The 1955–56 NBA season was the tenth season of the National Basketball Association. The season ended with the Philadelphia Warriors winning the NBA Championship, beating the Fort Wayne Pistons 4 games to 1 in the NBA Finals.

Notable occurrences 
 The Hawks relocate from Milwaukee, Wisconsin to St. Louis, Missouri.
 The NBA hands out a Most Valuable Player award for the first time. Its inaugural recipient is Bob Pettit of the St. Louis Hawks. Also, the All-NBA teams are no longer positionless and now have two guards, two forwards, and a center on each team.
 The 1956 NBA All-Star Game was played in Rochester, New York, with the West beating the East 108–94. Bob Pettit of the St. Louis Hawks wins the game's MVP award.

Final standings

Eastern Division

Western Division

x – clinched playoff spot

Playoffs

Statistics leaders

Note: Prior to the 1969–70 season, league leaders in points, rebounds, and assists were determined by totals rather than averages.

NBA awards
Most Valuable Player: Bob Pettit, St. Louis Hawks
Rookie of the Year: Maurice Stokes, Rochester Royals

All-NBA First Team:
F – Paul Arizin, Philadelphia Warriors
F – Bob Pettit, St. Louis Hawks
C – Neil Johnston, Philadelphia Warriors
G – Bob Cousy, Boston Celtics
G – Bill Sharman, Boston Celtics

 All-NBA Second Team:
F – Dolph Schayes, Syracuse Nationals
F – Maurice Stokes, Rochester Royals
C – Clyde Lovellette, Minneapolis Lakers
G – Jack George, Philadelphia Warriors
G – Slater Martin, Minneapolis Lakers

References
1955–56 NBA Season Summary basketball-reference.com. Retrieved December 10, 2010